ʿAyyāsh ibn Abī Rabīʿa was one of the Islamic prophet Muhammad's companions who converted into Islam before immigration. He was also a half brother of Abu Jahl as they shared the same mother, and his paternal cousin.

Imprisonment by Abu Jahl
Ayyash was one of the immigrants who migrated to Madinah before Muhammad. He migrated with Umar ibn Khattab. Abu Jahl decided to take him back. So he made a false story of Ayyash's mother's illness. Abu Jahl went to Madinah with his brother Harith and told Ayyash that his mother was ill and she had taken an oath that she would not sit in shade and would not comb her hair before she sees Ayyash's face. Umar warned Ayyash not to go. But Ayyash was so emotional that he became strongly determined. Then Umar gave his own healthy camel to Ayyash to help him escape if needed. On the way to Makkah, Abu Jahl cleverly tied Ayyash and took him to Makkah and then imprisoned him.

Muhammad's prayer
Salama ibn Hisham reported that Abu Hurayra said that, Prophet Muhammad used to say it in his prayers, "O' Allah, rescue Ayyash ibn Abi Rabia! O' Allah, rescue Salama ibn Hisham! O'
Allah, rescue al-Walid ibn al-Walid! O' Allah, rescue all oppressed believers!O' Allah, be
hard on Mudhars! O Allah, give them droughts like the drought years of Yusuf!"
(Sahih Bukhari: 6541)

Death

Ayyash participated in the Battle of Yarmouk in 636 AD and was martyred in the battle. He was then buried with his brother, Salama, and his paternal nephew, Ikrimah. He was martyred during the 2nd year of his maternal nephew Umar ibn Al Khattab's caliphate. After the battle, Ayyash's cousin, Khalid ibn Al Waleed, went to the grave of Ayyash, Salama and Ikrimah, and said that Banu Makhzum had never known two brothers like Ayyash and Salama.

See also
Sahabah 
Abu Jahl

References

External links
Ayyash ibn Abi Rabiah at nasabu-n-nabyy

636 deaths
Banu Makhzum
Year of birth missing
Companions of the Prophet